Meggyeskovácsi is a village in Vas county, Hungary.

References 

Populated places in Vas County